Gunili (also Romanized as Gūnīlī; also known as Goneylī and Guney) is a village in Aq Su Rural District, in the Central District of Kalaleh County, Golestan Province, Iran. At the 2006 census, its population was 118, in 28 families.

References 

Populated places in Kalaleh County